The Netherlands first sent athletes to the UCI Road World Championships in the begin 1920s when only amateur cyclist competed. The nation's first medal, a bronze, was earned by Gerrit van den Berg in the men's amateur road race. Kees Pellenaars won the first gold medal for the Netherlands in the amateur road race. Theo Middelkamp won the first gold medal in the elite category in 1947.

List of medalists 
This a list of Dutch medals won at the UCI Road World Championships.

Sources

Team time trial medalists

Since the 2012 UCI Road World Championships there is the men's and women's team time trial event for trade teams and these medals are included under the UCI registration country of the team. Here are listed of the medalists who won a medal with a non-Dutch based team.

Most successful Dutch competitors

Medal table

Medals by year

Medals by discipline
updated after 29 September of the 2019 UCI Road World Championships

References

See also

Netherlands at other UCI events
 Netherlands at the UCI Track Cycling World Championships
 Netherlands at the UCI Track Cycling World Cup Classics

Netherlands at cycling events
Nations at the UCI Road World Championships